CFC Hertha 06 is a German association football club from the Charlottenburg district of Berlin. The club's greatest success has been promotion to the tier five NOFV-Oberliga Nord in 2015.

Apart from football the club also offers chess, table tennis and bowling as other sports. The club should not confused with two other clubs in Berlin bearing Hertha in their name, Hertha BSC and Hertha Zehlendorf.

History
Formed in 1906 as FC Vorwärts Charlottenburg, the team changed its name to CFC Hertha 06 two years later. The club has, for the most part of its history, played in the lower leagues of Berlin football. It achieved brief success in the 1960s when it won promotion to the tier three Amateurliga Berlin and played there for five seasons from 1965 to 1970 before being relegated again. A tenth place in 1965–66 was the club's best result in this era.

The club experienced a revival from the mid-2000s when two consecutive promotions took the team from the tier nine Kreisliga B to the tier seven Bezirksliga by 2005. After three seasons there Hertha won another promotion, now to the Landesliga, where it played for three seasons until relegation in 2011. Back in the Bezirksliga the club quickly recovered, won another promotion and returned to the Landesliga. After two seasons there a championship in 2013–14 took Hertha up to the Berlin-Liga. At this level the club finished runners-up in its first season there. An expansion of the Regionalliga Nordost made an extra promotion spot available for the Berlin-Liga and CFC Hertha 06 moved up alongside league champions Tennis Borussia Berlin to the NOFV-Oberliga Nord for the first time for 2015–16.

Honours
The club's honours:
 Berlin-Liga
 Runners-up: 2015
 Landesliga Berlin II
 Champions: 2014
 Bezirksliga Berlin II
 Runners-up: 2012
 Bezirksliga Berlin III
 Champions: 2008

Recent seasons
The recent season-by-season performance of the club:

 With the introduction of the Regionalligas in 1994 and the 3. Liga in 2008 as the new third tier, below the 2. Bundesliga, all leagues below dropped one tier.

References

External links
Official website 
Official website of the football department 
CFC Hertha 06 at Weltfussball.de 

Charlottenburg Hertha 06
Hertha 06
Association football clubs established in 1906
1906 establishments in Germany